Grand Ayatollah Mohammad Ali Gerami Qomi (Persian:  محمدعلى گرامى قمي; born 1938) is an Iranian Twelver Shi'a Marja.

He has studied in seminaries of Qum, Iran under Grand Ayatollah Hussein-Ali Montazeri, Ali Meshkini, Seyyed Hossein Borujerdi, Mohammad Ali Araki, Mohammad-Reza Golpaygani and Mirza Hashem Amoli.

See also

 Grand Ayatollahs
 List of current Maraji
 Qom
 Ijtihad
 Marja

Notes

External links
Biography in Persian

Iranian grand ayatollahs
Iranian Islamists
Shia Islamists
1938 births
Living people
Society of Seminary Teachers of Qom members